Anthony Peter Musante Jr. (June 30, 1936 – November 26, 2013) was an American actor, best known for the TV series Toma as Detective David Toma, Nino Schibetta in Oz (1997), and Joe D'Angelo in As the World Turns (2000–2003). In movies, he achieved fame relatively early in his career, starring or having significant roles in such films as Once a Thief (1965), The Incident (1967), The Detective (1968) and The Last Run (1971), and also in a number of Italian productions, including The Mercenary (1968), Metti, una sera a cena (1969) and The Bird with the Crystal Plumage (1970).

Life and career
Musante was born in Bridgeport, Connecticut, into an Italian-American family, the son of Natalie Anne (née Salerno), a school teacher, and Anthony Peter Musante, an accountant. He attended Oberlin College and Northwestern University.

Musante acted in numerous feature films, in the United States and elsewhere, including Italy. Among his body of work are the 1973 television series Toma (predecessor to Baretta) and the soap opera As the World Turns, and the 1975 Broadway play, P. S. Your Cat Is Dead!, for which he was nominated for a Drama Desk Award.

Toma did well in the ratings despite tough opposition, but Musante insisted upon leaving the series after one year, as was permitted by his contract. The series was revised as Baretta, with Robert Blake in the lead role, and it was a success. At the time of his death, The New York Times referred to Toma as "the show that got away." But Musante never regretted leaving the series, despite sacrificing money and fame.

He was nominated for an Emmy Award for his work in a 1975 episode of Medical Center, A Quality of Mercy. Musante also played Nino Schibetta, a feared Mafia boss and the Italian gang leader inside of Emerald City during the first season of the HBO television series Oz.

Death
Musante died of a hemorrhage, following oral surgery on November 26, 2013, aged 77, in Manhattan.

Filmography

 The DuPont Show of the Week: Ride with Terror (1963, TV series episode) - Joe Ferrone
 Bob Hope Presents the Chrysler Theatre: A Wind of Hurricane Force (1964, TV series episode) - Major DeGuisado
 Alfred Hitchcock Presents: Memo from Purgatory (1964, TV series episode) - Candle
 Once a Thief (1965) - Cleveland 'Cleve' Shoenstein
 The Trials of O'Brien: Bargain Day on the Street of Regret (1965, TV series episode) - Coley Thomas
 The Trials of O'Brien: The Blue Steel Suite (1966, TV series episode) - Callison
 The Fugitive: The Blessings of Liberty (1966, TV series episode) - Billy Karnes
 The Incident (1967) - Joe Ferrone
 The Detective (1968) - Felix
 The Mercenary (Italy, 1968) - Paco Román
 Metti, una sera a cena (Italy, 1969) - Max
 The Bird with the Crystal Plumage (Italy, 1970) - Sam Dalmas
 The Anonymous Venetian (Italy, 1970) - Enrico
 Grissom Gang (1971) - Eddie Hagan
 The Last Run (1971) - Paul Rickard
 Il caso Pisciotta (Italy, 1972) - Francesco Scauri
 Marcus Welby, M.D.: The Tall Tree (1973, TV series episode) - David
 Toma (1973–1974, TV series, 23 episodes) - Det. David Toma
 Police Story: Fathers and Sons (1974, TV series episode) - Joe Basic
  (1975, TV film) - Lt. William Calley
 The Rockford Files: Charlie Harris at Large (1975, TV series episode) - Charlie Harris
 The Desperate Miles (1975, TV film) - Joe Larkin
 Medical Story: The God Syndrome (1975, TV series episode) - Dr. Paul Brandon
 Police Story: Breaking Point (1975, TV series episode) - Sgt. Vince Della Maggiori
 Medical Story: The Quality of Mercy (1976, TV series episode) - Dr. Hoffman
 Origins of the Mafia (Italy, 1976, TV miniseries) - Michele Borello
 Police Story: The Other Side of the Badge (1976, TV series episode) - Jack Mitchell
  (1977, TV film) - Joey Faber
 Goodbye & Amen (Italy, 1978) - John Dhannay
 Break Up (Italy, 1978) - Paolo Naviase
 My Husband Is Missing (1978, TV film) - Derek Mackenzie
 Breaking Up Is Hard to Do (1979, TV film) - Sal Falcone
 The Thirteenth Day: The Story of Esther (1979, TV film) - King Ahasuerus
 High Ice (1980, TV film) - Lt. Col. Harris Thatcher
 American Playhouse: Weekend (1982, TV series episode) - George
  (Italy, 1983) - Jurek Rudinski
 The Pope of Greenwich Village (1984) - Pete
 Rearview Mirror (1984, TV film) - Vince Martino
 MacGruder and Loud (1985, TV pilot episode) - Caferelli
 The Trap (Italy, 1985) - Michael Parker
 The Repenter (Italy, 1985) - Vanni Ragusa
 The Equalizer: Pretenders (1986, TV series episode) - John Parker
 Nutcracker: Money, Madness and Murder (1987, TV miniseries) - Vittorio
 Night Heat: Grace  (1987, TV series episode) - Roy Barnett
 La collina del diavolo (Italy, 1988, TV film) - Daniele
 Jesse Hawkes: Little Girl Lost (1989, TV series episode)
  (Italy, 1989, TV miniseries) - Kirk Mesana
 Il barone (Italy, 1995, TV miniseries) - Baron Sajeva
 Deep Family Secrets (1997, TV film) - Lennox
 Oz (1997, TV series, 7 episodes) - Nino Schibetta
 Nothing Sacred: Song of Songs (1997, TV series episode) - Gary
 Exiled: A Law & Order Movie (1998, TV film) - Don Giancarlo Uzielli
 Acapulco H.E.A.T.: Code Name Million Dollar Man (1998, TV series episode) - Rocco Santora
 The Deep End of the Ocean (1999) - Angelo Cappadora
  (1999, TV miniseries) - Duraid Al Simma
 The Yards (2000) - Seymour Korman
 Un bacio nel buio (Italy, 2000, TV miniseries)
 As the World Turns (2000–2003, TV series) - Joe D'Angelo
 100 Centre Street (2001, TV series, 3 episodes) - Albert Esposito
 Life as It Comes (Italy, 2003) - Karl, the Professor
 Traffic (2004, TV miniseries) - Alex Edmonds
  (Italy, 2004) - Amilcare
  (Italy, 2007, TV miniseries) - Alpius
 We Own the Night (2007) - Jack Shapiro
  (Italy, 2013, TV miniseries) - Don Luigi Vitiello

References

External links

1936 births
2013 deaths
American people of Italian descent
American male film actors
American male television actors
Oberlin College alumni
Male actors from Bridgeport, Connecticut
Northwestern University School of Communication alumni